Canaris may refer to:

People
 Claus-Wilhelm Canaris (1937–2021), German jurist
 Wilhelm Canaris (1887–1945), German admiral and spymaster

Other uses
 Cañari, a native tribe in Ecuador
 Cañaris District, Ferreñafe, Peru
 Canaris (film), a 1954 West German biopic
 Canaris (album), a 2008 album by Chris Brokaw

See also
 Canaries (disambiguation)
 Kanaris (disambiguation)